Quisqueya is a municipality (municipio) of the San Pedro de Macorís province in the Dominican Republic.

For comparison with other municipalities and municipal districts see the list of municipalities and municipal districts of the Dominican Republic.

References

Populated places in San Pedro de Macorís Province
Municipalities of the Dominican Republic